Catacao (Katakao) is an extinct language of Peru.

Languages of Peru
Catacaoan languages